Goole railway station is a railway station in town of Goole on the Hull and Doncaster Branch in the East Riding of Yorkshire, England.

The station and its passenger services are managed and provided by Northern. Lines from Goole run north to the Hull and Selby Line at Gilberdyke (formerly Staddlethorpe); south to the South Humberside Main Line near Thorne; there is also a westward line to Knottingley mostly used by freight, with an infrequent passenger service.

The station opened in 1869 replacing a terminus station in the Goole docks.

Facilities
The station has a ticket office on platform 2 (southbound), which is staffed part-time (07:00 - 13:30) on weekdays and Saturdays only. A self-service ticket machine is available for use outside of these times and for collecting pre-paid tickets.  A waiting room and vending machine are provided on platform 2 and a shelter on platform 1, along with extensive canopies on each side.  Digital display screens, timetable posters and automated announcements are used to give train running information.  Step-free access is available to both platforms via the ramped subway linking them.

Services
Monday to Saturday daytimes there are two trains an hour eastbound to Hull (one of which continues to  via the Yorkshire Coast Line) and towards  and  southbound. One of the latter runs express to Sheffield, whilst the other stops at all stations.

On Sundays, there are two trains per hour each to Hull and Doncaster, with hourly extensions to Sheffield and Bridlington/Scarborough.

Only one train (the 17:58 from Leeds) runs in the opposite direction (the other early morning one runs empty from Leeds to take up its return working). The service was more frequent in the 1980s, but was reduced in 1991 (due to a DMU shortage) and again in 2004 (when the mid-day service was curtailed at Knottingley). It continues to run mainly so that the TOC meets its statutory franchise requirements and avoids the need for the line to be put through the formal closure process.

There is no Sunday service on this route.

In February 2013 the line northeast of Hatfield and Stainforth station towards Thorne was blocked by the Hatfield Colliery landslip, with all services over the section halted. As a result, from Goole rail services to Doncaster & Sheffield were suspended and replaced by road transport.  The line reopened to traffic in July 2013.

History 
The Wakefield, Pontefract and Goole Railway obtained authorisation in 1845 to build a railway to Goole as well as building a pier and improving the harbour. However, it was amalgamated before construction with the Manchester and Leeds Railway in 1846. In 1847 the Manchester and Leeds Railway was authorised to change its name to the Lancashire and Yorkshire Railway, and in 1848 the L&YR was Goole's first connected railway.

The current station was opened by the NER on 1 October 1869 (along with their line from Thorne Junction to Gilberdyke). The former L&Y line into the docks remained a busy freight route for many years afterwards, but has now been lifted (though access to the remaining dock sidings is still possible from the main line).

Goole station is mentioned in the song "Slow Train" by Flanders and Swann about various closed lines on the British railway network.No one departs, no one arrives, From Selby to Goole, from St Erth to St Ives.The Selby to Goole Line which opened in 1910, ran via the villages of Rawcliffe, Drax & Barlow until its closure in 1964.

There was a small buffet run by the Kitwood family on the up platform and a small office on the down platform serving a wholesale newspaper business run by Joe Kelbrick; nearby there is a small goods yard used by DB Cargo UK steel trains. The station saw heavy redevelopment in the 1970s.

Notes

References

External links

Railway stations in the East Riding of Yorkshire
DfT Category E stations
Former North Eastern Railway (UK) stations
Railway stations in Great Britain opened in 1869
Northern franchise railway stations
Goole
1869 establishments in England